The Australian Trade Union Training Authority (TUTA) was an Australian Government funded statutory authority providing education and training programs for union officials.

Michael Beahan was seconded from the Trades and Labor Council in 1974 with two others to set up TUTA in 1975 under the Whitlam Labor government. TUTA had quickly setup training centres in each state capital. It also opened the Clyde Cameron College in 1977. TUTA was abolished on 5 December 1996 by the Workplace Relations and Other Legislation Amendment Act 1996 (Cth).

Defunct Commonwealth Government agencies of Australia